The 2018–19 Iraq FA Cup was the 29th edition of the Iraqi knockout football cup as a clubs-only competition, the main domestic cup in Iraqi football. A total of 20 teams from the Iraqi Premier League and 25 teams from the Iraq Division One and Iraq Division Two participated. It started on 12 September 2018 and the final was played on 26 July 2019 at the Al-Shaab Stadium in Baghdad.

The winners of the competition were Al-Zawraa, who extended their record number of cup wins to 16 with a 1–0 victory over Al-Kahrabaa, thanks to a late goal by Safaa Hadi.

Format

Participation 
The cup starts with the first round, consisting of 24 teams from the Iraq Division One and Iraq Division Two. 1 team is automatically placed in the playoff round, where they face one of the first round's winners for a place in the Round of 32. The 20 Iraqi Premier League clubs join the 12 qualified teams to form the Round of 32.

Cards 
If a player receives a second yellow card, they will be banned from the next cup match. If a player receives a red card, they will be banned a minimum of one match, but more can be added by the Iraq Football Association.

Participating clubs 
The following 45 teams participated in the competition:

Bold: indicated teams are still in competition

Schedule 
The rounds of the 2018–19 competition are scheduled as follows:

First round 
24 teams from the Division One and Division Two competed in this round, and 1 team Al-Mohandessin was automatically placed into the playoff round.

Playoff round

Final phase

Bracket

Round of 32 
20 top-tier teams and 12 lower-tier teams competed in this round.

First leg

Second leg

Round of 16 
All remaining teams are from the top-tier.

First leg

Second leg

Quarter-finals

First leg

Second leg

Semi-finals

Final

References

External links
 Iraq Football Association

 
Iraq
Cup